Canada has participated in every edition of the World Athletics Championships since the inaugural event in 1983. Canada hosted the World Championships in Edmonton in 2001, which was the first time the event was held in North America.

Medalists

Medal tables

By championships

By event

By gender

References

IAAF World Athletics Championships Doha 2019 Statistics Handbook. IAAF. Retrieved 29 September 2019.

Canada
 
World Athletics Championships